Daire O'Leary (born 2002) is an Irish hurler who plays as a defender for club side Watergrasshill, at divisional level with Imokilly and at inter-county level with the Cork senior hurling team.

Career

O'Leary first came to prominence at juvenile and underage levels with the Watergrasshill club before joining the club's intermediate team in 2020. As a schoolboy at St. Colman's College he also lined out in various hurling competitions including the Harty Cup. O'Leary first appeared on the inter-county scene with the Cork minor team before he won consecutive All-Ireland Under-20 Championships in 2020 and 2021. He joined the Cork senior hurling team as a member of the extended training panel in 2021 and was a panellist for the National League game against Limerick.

Career statistics

Honours

Cork
 All-Ireland Under-20 Hurling Championship: 2020, 2021
 Munster Under-20 Hurling Championship: 2020, 2021

References

2002 births
Living people
UCC hurlers
Watergrasshill hurlers
Imokilly hurlers
Cork inter-county hurlers